The Ezra A. Huntington House, at 11 Seminary St. in Auburn, New York, was built in 1861.  It served as the house of first president of the Auburn Theological Seminary.  It is somewhat Italianate in style.

It was home of Ezra Abel Huntington (1813-1901).

In January 2020, the City of Auburn's Historic Resources Review Board's meeting minutes note that the property had been nominated to the New York State Historic Register and was recommended to be nominated to the U.S. National Register of Historic Places.  In fact it was listed on the National Register on January 31, 2020.

In July 2021, Andrew Roblee, who authored its National Register nomination for the house's owners Strpen and Judy Coleman, penned an Auburn Citizen column about the history of the house and its mist famous occupant.

Later in 2021, the Preservation Association of Central New York was to award its Stewardship Award to Dr. Stephen and Judy Coleman for their longterm care of the house.

References

Further reading

External links

National Register of Historic Places in Cayuga County, New York
Buildings and structures completed in 1861
Houses on the National Register of Historic Places in New York (state)
Buildings and structures in Auburn, New York
Italianate architecture in New York (state)
Houses in Cayuga County, New York